The Eclipse is a greyhound racing competition held annually at Nottingham Greyhound Stadium.

It was inaugurated in 1938 at Lythalls Lane Stadium in Coventry. Following the closure of the stadium in 1964 the competition ended for a period of three years before briefly being re-introduced at Kings Heath Stadium.

Kings Heath closed down in 1971 which led to Hall Green Stadium acting as a temporary host before the race returned to its roots in Coventry at the Brandon Stadium. Coventry stopped greyhound racing in 1986, which resulted in Nottingham taking the event and holding it since.

In 2022, the prize money increased with the sponsorship of Premier Greyhound Racing and the winners purse was £20,000.

Past winners

Venues 
1938-1964 (Lythalls Lane, Coventry) 
1967-1970 (Kings Heath)
1971-1972 (Hall Green 480y)
1979-1985 (Brandon, Coventry)
1987–present (Nottingham 500m)

Sponsors
 1994–1994 (Peter Derrick Bookmakers)
 2001–2001 (John Smith's)
 2002–2002 (Ladbrokes)
 2003–2003 (Stadium Bookmakers)
 2004–2017 (Betfred)
 2018–2018 (MSCM Ltd)
 2019–2020 (Carling Brewery)
 2021–2021 (Arena Racing Company)
 2022–present (Premier Greyhound Racing)

References

Greyhound racing competitions in the United Kingdom
Sport in Nottingham
Recurring sporting events established in 1938